Sherwyn Naicker (born 26 March 1991) is a South African former professional soccer player who played as a goalkeeper.

Career
Naicker has played for SuperSport United, Tshakhuma Tsha Madzivhandila, Jomo Cosmos and Lamontville Golden Arrows.

He retired from football, beginning work as a sales executive for a beverage company in September 2019. In May 2020 he accused Jomo Cosmos manager Jomo Sono and player Bamuza Sono of falsely accusing him of match fixing and ruining his reputation. The claims were denied by Jomo Sono, who threatened Naicker with legal action.

In July 2020 Naicker was reported to be close to returning to professional football.

References

1991 births
Living people
South African soccer players
SuperSport United F.C. players
Tshakhuma Tsha Madzivhandila F.C. players
Jomo Cosmos F.C. players
Lamontville Golden Arrows F.C. players
South African Premier Division players
National First Division players
Association football goalkeepers